Gamut is the range of colors that can be reproduced by a particular printing process, display device, or set of paints.
In figurative speech it means range or scale.

Gamut may also refer to:

Arts and design 
 Gamut (music), a complete scale in medieval music
 Gamut mapping, a computer graphics technique
 The Gamut (album)

People 
 L. T. F. Gamut, a collective pseudonym for five Dutch logicians
 David Gamut, character in James Fenimore Cooper's novel The Last of the Mohicans

Journals 
 The Gamut, a poetry magazine at Harvard University
 Gamut: The Journal of the Music Theory Society of the Mid-Atlantic, an online music journal
 Gamut: Journal of the Georgia Association of Music Theorists, a now defunct academic journal

Places 
 Gamut, Tago, Surigao del Sur, a barangay in the Philippines

Sports 
 Gamut2, an indoor sweep rowing machine